Voldemar Rõks (15 July 1900 – 27 December 1941) was an Estonian footballer. He studied economics at the University of Tartu between 1921-1924, but never graduated. Rõks worked as a procurator for Bank of Estonia.

Career
Rõks earned 2 caps for the Estonian national team in 1924. He spent his brief career playing for JK Tallinna Kalev and participated at the 1924 Summer Olympics.

He became an Estonian champion in 1923 with JK Tallinna Kalev. He was arrested by the Soviet authorities and was deported to a labor camp in Perm Oblast. He died there due to an illness and hunger.

Honours
JK Tallinna Kalev
 Estonian Top Division: 1923

References

1900 births
1941 deaths
People from Türi Parish
People from the Governorate of Estonia
Estonian footballers
Estonia international footballers
Footballers at the 1924 Summer Olympics
Olympic footballers of Estonia
JK Tallinna Kalev players
People who died in the Gulag
Estonian people who died in Soviet detention
Association football midfielders
University of Tartu alumni